SMU Ghana was established in 2007 by KnowledgeWorkz Ltd - Ghana as Ghana's maiden Authorized Study centre of Sikkim Manipal University, India. It is Located at the Ring Road Central opposite Provident Towers in Accra.

SMU Ghana Learning Centre offers bachelor's and master's degrees programs in the following departments:
 Department of IT (Information Technology)
 Department of Management
 Department of Journalism & Mass Communication

The Centre has an alumni base of more than 1000 students from Ghana, Nigeria, Liberia and other West African countries. Including French & English speaking nationals.

See also
List of universities in Ghana

Notes

Universities in Ghana
Educational institutions established in 2002
2002 establishments in Ghana